Rose Kerr may refer to:

 Rose Kerr (Girl Guiding) (1882–1944), British pioneer Guider
 Rose Kerr (art historian) (born 1953), English curator and art historian, specializing in Chinese art